Sonja McLaughlan is a sports broadcaster born 1962. Mainly known as one of faces of BBC’s Six Nations television coverage. Joined corporation as trainee in 1988 and has since covered 7 summer Olympics from Atlanta in 1996 to Tokyo 2020. Now experienced freelancer working for BBC Sport, 5 Live Sport, BT Sport and Amazon Prime Video among others.

Early career 
McLaughlan joined the BBC in 1988 as a trainee and became a news producer on Radio Sussex. She moved to London in 1993, and became a producer in BBC Radio's sports department. In 1995, she became the BBC's Rugby Union producer.

Career 
McLaughlan has reported from every Olympic games since Atlanta in 1996 and has worked across some major outside broadcasts including the World Athletics Championships, the London Marathon and the Boat Race.

McLaughlan has made her name in Rugby Union and is one of the many faces on the BBC's coverage of the 6 Nations Championship. She does the touchline interview. McLaughlan also covers Athletics for Radio 5 Live and is a regular face on the BBC's News Channel.

McLaughlan was part of the UK Channel 4 commentary team for the London 2012 Paralympics.

References

External links
Sonja McLaughlan profile at TV Newsroom

BBC newsreaders and journalists
BBC World News
Living people
Year of birth missing (living people)